Ioglycamic acid (trade name Biligram) is a pharmaceutical drug that was used as an iodinated contrast medium for X-ray imaging of the gall bladder.

References 

Radiocontrast agents
Iodoarenes
Benzoic acids
Acetanilides